This is a list of the districts ('grid squares') of Milton Keynes, England. This list only includes settlements in its 1967 designated area. For a complete list of areas in the borough, see civil parishes in the City of Milton Keynes.

Click on marker beside "Name" or "Civil Parish" to sort into desired order

References